Centre for Mined Land Rehabilitation is a member of the Sustainable Minerals Institute (previously the Sir James Foots Institute of Mineral Resources), the Centre was established at the University of Queensland in 1993 and has built on more than twenty years involvement with the mining and minerals industries. CMLR is involved in a broad range of research and training projects with mining companies, industry bodies and government departments from across Australia and the world.

In November 2013, CMLR will celebrate 20 years anniversary.

External links

homepage
The University of Queensland
Sustainable Minerals Institute

Mining organisations in Australia
Mining in Queensland
Land management in Australia